SV Werder Bremen improved one position upon its 2000–01 position, ultimately finishing 6th in the championship. Key players Frank Rost and Torsten Frings departed for Bundesliga opposition in the summer of 2002, resulting in lowered expectations, especially since club legend Marco Bode decided to retire from professional football.

Players

First-team squad
Squad at end of season

Left club during season

Reserve team

Werder Bremen's reserve team finished 10th in the Regionalliga Nord.

Results

Bundesliga
 Freiburg-Werder Bremen 3–0
 1–0 Levan Kobiashvili (50)
 2–0 Ibrahim Tanko (87)
 3–0 Soumaila Coulibaly (90)
 Werder Bremen-Energie Cottbus 3–2
 1–0 Fabian Ernst (15)
 1–1 Radosław Kałużny (25)
 1–2 Antun Labak (29)
 2–2 Ailton (55)
 3–2 Ailton (64)
 Stuttgart-Werder Bremen 0–0
 Werder Bremen-1860 Munich 1–3
 0–1 Daniel Borimirov (30)
 1–1 Andreas Herzog (34)
 1–2 Paul Agostino (39)
 1–3 Markus Schroth (58)
 Kaiserslautern-Werder Bremen 2–1
 0–1 Ivica Banović (14)
 1–1 Hany Ramzy (64)
 2–1 Miroslav Klose (70)
 Werder Bremen-Köln 1–1
 0–1 Dirk Lottner (15)
 1–1 Ailton (68)
 Hamburg-Werder Bremen 0–4
 0–1 Ailton (14)
 0–2 Marco Bode (30)
 0–3 Fabian Ernst (84)
 0–4 Paul Stalteri (86)
 Werder Bremen-Mönchengladbach 1–0
 1–0 Frank Verlaat (84)
 Werder Bremen-Nürnberg 3–0
 1–0 Krisztián Lisztes (4)
 2–0 Krisztián Lisztes (56)
 3–0 Fabian Ernst (90)
 Hertha BSC-Werder Bremen 3–1
 1–0 Pál Dárdai (6)
 1–1 Ailton (7)
 2–1 Bart Goor (32)
 3–1 Marko Rehmer (61)
 Werder Bremen-Wolfsburg 1–0
 1–0 Marco Bode (79)
 Hansa Rostock-Werder Bremen 0–1
 0–1 Ivan Klasnić (74)
 Werder Bremen-Bayern Munich 1–0
 1–0 Viktor Skrypnyk (40 pen)
 Schalke 04-Werder Bremen 1–4
 0–1 Marco Bode (20)
 0–2 Ailton (28)
 0–3 Krisztián Lisztes (49)
 0–4 Viktor Skrypnyk (51 pen)
 1–4 Ebbe Sand (58)
 Werder Bremen-Bayer Leverkusen 2–1
 0–1 Bernd Schneider (38)
 1–1 Marco Bode (39)
 2–1 Frank Verlaat (58)
 St. Pauli-Werder Bremen 0–3
 0–1 Viktor Skrypnyk (19 pen)
 0–2 Ailton (55)
 0–3 Tim Borowski (70)
 Werder Bremen-Borussia Dortmund 1–1
 1–0 Torsten Frings (40)
 1–1 Ewerthon (56)
 Werder Bremen-Freiburg 3–2
 1–0 Marco Bode (13)
 1–1 Soumaila Coulibaly (45 + 1)
 2–1 Mladen Krstajić (51)
 2–2 Andreas Zeyer (53)
 3–2 Viktor Skrypnyk (59 pen)
 Energie Cottbus-Werder Bremen 2–1
 0–1 Ailton (28)
 1–1 János Mátyus (41)
 2–1 Marko Topić (49)
 Werder Bremen-Stuttgart 1–2
 1–0 Marco Bode (40)
 1–1 Ioan Ganea (62)
 1–2 Christian Tiffert (84)
 1860 Munich-Werder Bremen 3–1
 1–0 Paul Agostino (18)
 1–1 Krisztián Lisztes (24)
 2–1 Martin Max (68)
 3–1 Thomas Häßler (74 pen)
 Werder Bremen-Kaiserslautern 1–0
 1–0 Ailton (51)
 Köln-Werder Bremen 0–0
 Werder Bremen-Hamburg 0–1
 0–1 Bernardo Romeo (74)
 Mönchengladbach-Werder Bremen 1–0
 1–0 Peter Van Houdt (36)
 Nürnberg-Werder Bremen 0–4
 0–1 Torsten Frings (6)
 0–2 Ailton (21)
 0–3 Ailton (30)
 0–4 Paul Stalteri (51)
 Werder Bremen-Hertha BSC 0–3
 0–1 Denis Lapaczinski (62)
 0–2 Alex Alves (66)
 0–3 Alex Alves (85)
 Wolfsburg-Werder Bremen 2–0
 1–0 Diego Klimowicz (64)
 2–0 Martin Petrov (78)
 Werder Bremen-Hansa Rostock 4–3
 1–0 Ailton (3)
 1–1 René Rydlewicz (24)
 1–2 Antonio Di Salvo (30)
 2–2 Torsten Frings (47)
 2–3 Rayk Schröder (49)
 3–3 Frank Rost (90)
 4–3 Ailton (90 + 2 pen)
 Bayern Munich-Werder Bremen 2–2
 1–0 Claudio Pizarro (21)
 1–1 Ailton (24)
 2–1 Roque Santa Cruz (55)
 2–2 Mladen Krstajić (90 + 2)
 Werder Bremen-Schalke 04 3–0
 1–0 Frank Baumann (24)
 2–0 Ailton (63)
 3–0 Torsten Frings (77)
 Bayer Leverkusen-Werder Bremen 1–2
 0–1 Krisztián Lisztes (5)
 1–1 Zé Roberto (31)
 1–2 Ailton (61)
 Werder Bremen-St. Pauli 3–2
 0–1 Christian Rahn (5)
 0–2 Thomas Meggle (16)
 1–2 Torsten Frings (50)
 2–2 Marco Bode (54)
 3–2 Torsten Frings (78)
 Borussia Dortmund-Werder Bremen 2–1
 0–1 Paul Stalteri (17)
 1–1 Jan Koller (41)
 2–1 Ewerthon (74)

Statistics

Topscorers
  Ailton 16
  Marco Bode 7
  Torsten Frings 6
  Krisztián Lisztes 5
  Fabian Ernst 3
  Paul Stalteri 3

References

Notes

SV Werder Bremen seasons
Werder Bremen